Bembou is an arrondissement of Saraya in Kédougou Region in Senegal.

References 

Arrondissements of Senegal